EHR may refer to:

Places
 Ehr, Germany, a municipality in Rhineland-Palatinate
 Henderson City-County Airport (FAA LID: EHR, ICAO: KEHR), in Kentucky, United States

Other uses
 Bab El Ehr, a fictional character in The Adventures of Tintin by Hergé
 Electronic health record, or EHR
 European Hit Radio (Latvian: Eiropas Hītu Radio), or EHR, a commercial radio station in Baltic states
 The Economic History Review, or The EHR, an academic journal 
 The English Historical Review, or The EHR, an academic journal